Vexillum blandulum is a species of small sea snail, marine gastropod mollusk in the family Costellariidae, the ribbed miters.

Description
The length of the shell attains 22.8 mm.

Distribution
This species occurs in the Red Sea

References

 Turner H. (1997) Three new species of mitriform gastropods with an illustrated check-list of the species living in the Red Sea (Gastropoda Prosobranchia: Muricoidea: Mitridae & Costellariidae). Argonauta 10(1-6): 3-31.

External links
 Blatterer H. (2019). Mollusca of the Dahab region (Gulf of Aqaba, Red Sea). Denisia. 43: 1-480

blandulum
Gastropods described in 1997